Occitania is the southernmost administrative region of metropolitan France excluding Corsica, created on 1 January 2016 from the former regions of Languedoc-Roussillon and Midi-Pyrénées. The Council of State approved Occitania as the new name of the region on 28 September 2016, coming into effect on 30 September 2016.

The modern administrative region is named after the larger cultural and historical region of Occitania, which corresponds with the southern third of France. The region of Occitania as it is today covers a territory similar to that ruled by the Counts of Toulouse in the 12th and 13th centuries. The banner of arms of the Counts of Toulouse, known colloquially as the Occitan cross, is used by the modern region and is also a popular cultural symbol. In 2015, Occitania had a population of 5,839,867.

Toponymy

Enacted in 2014, the territorial reform of French regions had been subject to debate for many years. The reform law used as the new region's provisional name, the hyphenated names of its predecessors: Languedoc-Roussillon and Midi-Pyrénées, in alphabetical order. As for most of the merged regions, a permanent name was then proposed by the new regional council to replace that provisional name. On 24 June 2016, the Regional Council of Languedoc-Roussillon-Midi-Pyrénées adopted the name Occitania after lengthy public consultation. The provisional name of the region was withdrawn on 30 September 2016, when the new name took effect.

The circa 450,000 French Catalans living in the region (or Catalans of the North, as they mostly call themselves) expressed dismay at the regional assembly resolution, regarding the new name as ignoring their presence. On 10 September 2016, some 10,000 people (7,800 according to the police) demonstrated in Perpignan, demanding that the merged region name contain the words  (literal translation: "Catalan country").

Geography
It has a Mediterranean coast on the southeast and is neighboured by Provence-Alpes-Côte d'Azur on the east, Auvergne-Rhône-Alpes on the northeast and Nouvelle-Aquitaine on the west and northwest, as well as foreign borders of Andorra (Canillo, Encamp, La Massana, Ordino) and Spain (Aragon and Catalonia) on the south.

Departments

Major communities

The largest communes of Occitania are (population :
 Toulouse (479,553)
 Montpellier (285,121)
 Nîmes (150,610)
 Perpignan (120,158)
 Béziers (77,177)
 Montauban (60,810)
 Narbonne (54,700)
 Albi (50,759)
 Carcassonne (47,365)

Economy
The gross domestic product (GDP) of the region was 171.2 billion euros in 2018, accounting for 7.3% of French economic output. GDP per capita adjusted for purchasing power was 26,000 euros or 86% of the EU27 average in the same year. The GDP per employee was 102% of the EU average.

Politics
Following the creation of the region in 2016, Carole Delga, a member of the Socialist Party, was elected to the presidency of the Regional Council of Occitania. The , where the Regional Council of Occitania meets, is situated in Toulouse.

Historical identity

The new administrative region includes provinces and territories of diverse cultural and historical origin: Languedoc (High and Low Languedoc), Països Catalans (Roussillon, Cerdanya, Vallespir, Conflent, Capcir), the County of Foix, and the eastern parts of what was formerly Gascony (Armagnac, Comminges, Couserans, Bigorre, Condomois, Nébouzan, Rivière-Verdun), and Guiana (Carcin, Roergue). During the Ancien Régime, most of these territories lay within the jurisdiction of the Parlement of Toulouse, founded in 1443.

Occitania

This territory was already united, in Roman times first as the Diocese of Vienne and then as the Seven Provinces and in Aquitaine at the beginning of the Middle Ages (Aquitanica, Visigoth kingdom of Toulouse), before the Frankish conquest. Occitania is characterized by "the Occitan culture", since the Middle Ages another expression of Romance culture in France and to a lesser extent in Italy, Spain and Monaco. It is presented and recognized on institutional sites of French communities, such as those of the Lot-et-Garonne County Council and the city of Agen.

Languedoc

Most of the territory that came to be called Languedoc (the region where  is spoken; in Occitan) became attached to the Kingdom of France in the 13th century, following the Albigensian Crusade (1208–1229). This crusade aimed to put an end to what the Church considered the Cathar heresy, and enabled the Capetian dynasty to extend its influence south of the Loire. As part of this process, the former principalities of Trencavel (the Viscounty of Albi, Carcassona, Besièrs, Agde and Nimes) were integrated into the Royal French Domain in 1224. The Counts of Toulouse followed them in 1271. The remaining feudal enclaves were absorbed progressively up to the beginning of the 16th century; the County of Gévaudan in 1258, the County of Melgueil (Mauguiò) in 1293, the Lordship of Montpellier in 1349 and the Viscounts of Narbonne in 1507.

The territory falling within the jurisdiction of the Estates of Languedoc, which convened for the first time in 1346, shrank progressively, becoming known during the Ancien Régime as the province of Languedoc.

The year 1359 marked a turning point in the history of the province. In that year, the three entered into a perpetual union, after which their contribution of royal officers was summoned jointly rather than separately for each of the three . 

Towards the end of the 14th century, the term "country of the three seneschalties", later to become known as Languedoc, designated the two bailiwicks of Bèucaire-Nimes and Carcassona, and the eastern part of Tolosa (Toulouse), retained under the Treaty of Brétigny. At that time, the County of Foix, which belonged to the seneschal of Carcassona until 1333 before passing to Toulouse, ceased to belong to Languedoc. In 1542, the province was divided into two : Toulouse for Haut-Languedoc, and Montpellier for Bas-Languedoc. This lasted until the French Revolution in 1789. From the 17th century onward, there was only one intendance for the whole of Languedoc, with its seat in Montpellier.

Haute-Guyenne

The former provinces of Gascony (in Gascon), and Guyenne; in Occitan  ) were historically part of the Great South-West of France, and derived from the medieval duchyies of Vasconia, Aquitaine and then Guyenne. Today, only the eastern regions of the two provinces are part of Occitania. These areas correspond essentially to the territories acquired by the kings of England, dukes of Guyenne, under the treaty of Brétigny of 1360, and which then remained under the jurisdiction of the provincial appellate court of Toulouse (Parlement of Toulouse) after the creation of the Parlement of Bordeaux in 1462. From that time, they were generally grouped under the name of Haute-Guyenne, by opposition with Basse-Guyenne, which was dependent on the Parlement of Bordeaux.

The territory of the former province of Guyenne (Guiana) that lies within the region corresponds with Quercy (the current department of Lot and the north of Tarn e Garona), and with Roergue (Avairon). These two counties are thus part of the Occitan linguistic area, in its Languedocien dialectal variant. They were possessions of the Counts of Toulouse from the 9th century, at various stages a minor branch or the main branch. Like the other possessions of the Counts of Toulouse, they were integrated for the first time with the French royal domain in 1271,and then yielded to the kings of England under the 1360 Treaty of Brétigny. The province of Quercy was definitely reunited with the Crown in 1472; Roergue, possession of the counts of Armagnac, did not follow until 1607. Both came within the province of Guyenne, under military rule from 1561. Today, the name Guyenne no longer has administrative or political currency, although the Haut-Agenais used the term  in a campaign which evoked its historical identity to promote the Lot-et-Garonne and part of the valley of Dròt. This reference is now superseded in the promotion of tourism by the designation . The appellations Quercy and Roergue, in contrast, retain a strong identity.

Gascony is the former province located on the territory of the current departments of Gers (Armanhac and Condomois), Hautes-Pyrénées (Bigorre), Lanas in the neighboring region, and parts of other departments of the two regions of Aquitània and Midi-Pyrénées (Comenge, Nebosan and Rivière-Verdun mainly in the south and west of Haute-Garonne, and Couserans in the western part of Ariège). Successively called Aquitania, Novempopulania, Vasconia (territory of the Vascones) and Gascony in the 13th century, the territory was geographically diverse, situated between the Atlantic Ocean, Garona and the Pyrenees. Claiming a cultural identity based on evolving occupation, from the Aquitani peoples of Proto-Basque language to a Gascon population sharing a latinized Occitan dialect, it constitutes the current Gascon linguistic area. Between the 15th and the beginning of the 16th centuries, it was progressively integrated into the Royal French domain. Comenge yielded to the kings of France in 1443, extinguishing the local dynasty. Armagnac, Bigorre and Nebosan followed, with the county of Foix, in 1607.

County of Foix (Fois)
The County of Foix is an old French county created out of the County of Carcassonne in around 1050 for Bernard Roger, son of Roger I of Carcassonna. In 1398, the county passed to House of Grailly and, in 1458, King Charles VII of France raised it to the Peerage of France in favor of Gaston IV, Count of Foix.

The county-peerage passed to the House of Albret in 1484, and then to House of Bourbon-Vendôme in 1548. In 1607, King Henry IV of France attached the county to the Royal French domain.

From the time of the French Revolution, the county was fully incorporated into the department of Ariège. The Occitan dialect traditionally spoken there is Languedocien.

Roussillon

The Ancien Régime province of Roussillon, which had formerly been integrated with the Catalan counties, the Kingdom of Majorca, and the Principality of Catalonia within the Crown of Aragon, was attached to the Crown of France under the Treaty of the Pyrenees, signed on 7 November 1659. Prior to this treaty, the border between the kingdom of France and the Principality of Catalonia lay further north, along a line of citadels (Treaty of Corbeil).

These territories corresponded to the Catalan counties of Roussillon and Conflent, founded in the 9th century, as well as to the northern part of the County of Cerdanya, to which was added the former Vicounty of Castelnou, or Vallespir (the pagus of County of Besalú, united with the County of Roussillon in 1209). The new Province of Roussillon also known simply as Roussillon, brought together the medieval administrative courts, or vigueries, of Roussillon, Conflent, and the north of the County of Cerdanya which were part of the government structure of the Crown of Aragon's (and attached to the Principality of Catalonia) counties of Roussillon and Cerdanya (governació dels comtats de Rosselló i Cerdanya in Catalan) at the time of their attachment to France. Roussillon was subject to direct taxation as a pays d'imposition (taxing country) and did not have representation through the Estates (a provincial assembly, the provincial assembly of Roussillon, was created on 15 August 1787). It formed both a government and an intendance and reported to the Secretary of State for War as a border province. It had sovereign jurisdiction: the Sovereign Council of Roussillon, independent of the Parlement of Toulouse.

Currently, the name Roussillon is still the most widely used to designate this territory, being found in the denomination of the former region of Languedoc-Roussillon.

Today, the territory is often subdivided into five unofficial traditional and natural comarques: Roussillon proper, Vallespir, Conflent, Upper Cerdanya and Capcir. A recent addition is Fenouillèdes, the Occitan part of the department of Pyrénées-Orientales.

See also
 Languedoc-Roussillon
 Midi-Pyrénées
 Occitania
 Regions of France

References

External links

 Merger of the regions - France 3
 Région Occitanie/Pyrénées-Méditerranée -

 
Regions of France
2016 establishments in France
States and territories established in 2016
France geography articles needing translation from French Wikipedia
2016 establishments in Europe
Massif Central